Pentrefoelas is a village and community in Conwy County Borough, Wales. The village lies on the A5 road between Betws-y-Coed to the west and Cerrigydrudion to the east. The Afon Merddwr river, a tributary of the River Conwy, flows through it. The community had a population of 356 at the time of the 2011 census, 70% were able to speak Welsh.  It has an area of 53.86 km2 and covers a large region around the village including part of Mynydd Hiraethog, Llyn Alwen and part of Alwen Reservoir. It is in the electoral ward of Llangernyw. The community includes the small settlement of Rhydlydan.

The name of the village comes from pentre (Welsh for "village") and a nearby hill, Foel Las ("green bare-topped hill"). The hill is the site of a motte built around 1164 in the time of Owain Gwynedd. Old Voelas House (or Plas Foel Las), mansion of the Wynne family, was built at the foot of the hill in 1545. It was demolished in 1819 and a new site was established two kilometres to the west. The current Voelas Hall was built in 1961 and was designed by the architect Clough Williams-Ellis.

Other buildings around the village include: 
Plas Iolyn, home to Rhys Fawr ap Maredudd, his son Robert ap Rhys (the chaplain to Cardinal Wolsey), his grandson the 16th-century MP Elis Prys (known as Dr Coch and notorious for his oppression of the district) and his great-grandson, the poet Tomos Prys. It is now a farmhouse. 
Gilar, built in the 16th century for the poet Rhys Wyn ap Cadwaladr (fl. c. 1600), perhaps by his father Cadwaladr ap Maurice after receiving a substantial grant of land from Henry VIII in 1545–1546, which included the land later occupied by Plas Iolyn and Old Voelas House. 
The village had a chapelry of Ysbyty Ifan built in 1766 and known as Voelas Chapel. The Parish Church was built on the same site in 1857–1859.
The Pentrefoelas watermill (Melin Voelas) for grinding flour dates from 1815 and was restored by Clwyd County Council as part of a heritage scheme. The ironwork for the external overshot waterwheel was originally cast by the Llanrwst Foundry probably sometime in the 19th century

Climate

Notable residents
Charlotte Godley (née Griffiths-Wynne), born in Voelas House, was the wife of John Robert Godley, founder of Christchurch, New Zealand.
Edward Wynne-Finch, born in Voelas House, first-class cricketer

References

External links

 A Vision of Britain Through Time
 British Listed Buildings
 Genuki
 Geograph
 Office for National Statistics
 Pentrefoelas

Villages in Conwy County Borough
Communities in Conwy County Borough